Rory Walton (born 11 April 1989) is an Australian rugby union footballer. His regular playing position is lock. In 2010 Walton joined the ACT Brumbies as a part of their extended playing squad, staying until 2012. Having previously played club rugby for Northern Suburbs in the Shute Shield, he was named in the Western Force Playing Squad for the 2013 and 2014 Super Rugby seasons. Walton later signed a two year contract to play both 2015 and 2016 seasons with The Western Force.

In March 2016, French Pro D2 side Carcassonne announced that they signed Walton prior to the 2016–17 season on a two-year contract.

In 2019 Walton announced his retirement from professional rugby after 9 years to pursue other opportunities.

Super Rugby statistics

References 

1989 births
Australian rugby union players
Australian expatriate rugby union players
Australian expatriate sportspeople in France
Expatriate rugby union players in France
Western Force players
Rugby union locks
Living people
Perth Spirit players
Rugby union players from Canberra